All China Lawyers Association (ACLA,; Pinyin: Zhōnghuá Quánguó Lǜshī Xiéhuì) is the official professional association for lawyers (the bar association in American terminology or law society in Commonwealth terminology) of the People's Republic of China. It was founded on July 7, 1986.  It carries out professional administration over lawyers in pursuit of law. All lawyers of China are members of the ACLA.  Currently, the ACLA has nearly 110,000 individual members. Its current President is Wang Junfeng.

In August 1998, the American Bar Association offered to assist the All-China Lawyers Association in preparing an independent bar.

Function
One of its six special committees is the Committee for the Protection of Lawyers' Lawful Rights, the largest committee that plays an increasingly role in protecting lawyers' rights and interests.

Lawyer Mo Shaoping is a member of the Human Rights and Constitutional Law Committee of the All China Lawyers Association. Specialized in criminal law, he and his cohort are known internationally for many politically sensitive cases, including that of Liu Xiaobo.

References

External links
 Official Website of All China Lawyers Association

Legal organizations based in China
Organizations established in 1986
Bar associations of Asia
1986 establishments in China
Organizations associated with the Chinese Communist Party